

94001–94100 

|-bgcolor=#f2f2f2
| colspan=4 align=center | 
|}

94101–94200 

|-bgcolor=#f2f2f2
| colspan=4 align=center | 
|}

94201–94300 

|-id=228
| 94228 Leesuikwan ||  || Lee Sui Kwan (born 1968), Chinese former vice president of the Hong Kong Astronomical Society, has been putting sustained efforts into astronomical popularization and education to the general public in Hong Kong. He has given several hundred astronomical talks to teenagers to stimulate their interest in astronomy. || 
|-id=291
| 94291 Django ||  || Django Reinhardt (1910–1953), a legendary Belgian Sinto Gypsy jazz guitarist composer, became renowned as a member of the famous ensemble "Quintette du Hot Club de France" in 1934. Despite limited use of his injured fretting hand, Reinhardt pushed guitar technique to new virtuosic heights. || 
|}

94301–94400 

|-id=356
| 94356 Naruto ||  || Naruto Strait (Naruto Kaikyō) is a strait between the Japanese islands of Shikoku and Awaji. || 
|-id=400
| 94400 Hongdaeyong ||  || Hong Daeyong (1731–1783), a Korean astronomer of the late Chosun Dynasty, worked to overcome old, conventional cosmology in Korea and advocated new concepts introduced through China. He also invented numerous astronomical instruments. || 
|}

94401–94500 

|-bgcolor=#f2f2f2
| colspan=4 align=center | 
|}

94501–94600 

|-id=556
| 94556 Janstarý ||  || Jan Starý (born 1950) has worked as an observer at Ondřejov Observatory of the Astronomical Institute of the Czech Academy of Sciences. He was involved in operations of fireball photographing cameras there for more than 10 years. Name suggested by P. Spurný. || 
|}

94601–94700 

|-bgcolor=#f2f2f2
| colspan=4 align=center | 
|}

94701–94800 

|-bgcolor=#f2f2f2
| colspan=4 align=center | 
|}

94801–94900 

|-id=884
| 94884 Takuya ||  || Takuya Matsuda (born 1943), a Japanese astrophysicist and professor in the department of Earth and planetary sciences at Kobe University, is a recognised authority on computer simulations, particularly of accretion disks and wind accretion. Also a relativitist, he has served as president of the Astronomical Society of Japan. || 
|}

94901–95000 

|-bgcolor=#f2f2f2
| colspan=4 align=center | 
|}

References 

094001-095000